[Domenico] Giovanni Antonio Pandolfi [Mealli] (Montepulciano, Tuscany, 1624 – Madrid) was an Italian composer and violinist.

Life and works
Pandolfi was born in Montepulciano in 1624, where he was baptised on 27 November, the second son of Giovanni Battista Pandolfi and the fourth son of his father's second wife, Verginia Bartalini, the widow of Mario Mealli. His name at baptism was Domenico; it would appear that he adopted the names Giovanni Antonio on entering religious orders at some stage of his life. His father was the servant of a lawyer. Pandolfi's stepbrother Lorenzo, at the age of around 8, had become a castrato singer at the court of Krakow. Another stepbrother, Giovan Battista Mealli, became a singer in Venice, where Domenico and the rest of the family joined him around 1630 following the death of old Pandolfi.

The annals of the court of Ferdinand Charles, Archduke of Austria in Innsbruck record that Giovanni Antonio Pandolfi Mealli  was employed at the court in 1660. He is believed to have trained as a musician in Perugia. He moved to Innsbruck in 1652, and his sonatas Opp. 2 and 3 are dedicated to other court musicians there, many of whom were Italian. He left Innsbruck in 1662, and then took a position in Messina.

Of Pandolfi's works, his two collections of sonatas for violin and harpsichord (Op. 3 and Op. 4) published 1660 and his trio sonatas (Sonate Cioè Balletti) published 1669 have survived; they are at the Civic Museum of Bologna. No trace is known of Pandolfi's Opp. 1 and 2. The violinist Andrew Manze believes the 1669 sonatas may be the work of another composer of a similar name, although the music historian David McCormick argues for their common authorship. He points out that Pandolfi is named on the title page of the 1669 sonatas (although without the additional surname Mealli) as a musician of Messina, and that the 1669 sonatas are named after court musicians of that city; one of them to the castrato Giovanni Marquett, whom Pandolfi was to murder a few years later.

Pandolfi killed Marquett in Messina on 21 December 1675 following a political argument in the Duomo. Pandolfi is described in a contemporary chronicle as a "priest of Montepulciano", and Marquett as "an impertinent layman and eunuch". It reports  that  Pandolfi had seized  Marquett's sword and killed him with it. After this Pandolfi fled first either to France or Catania,  and then to Spain, where he was employed from 1678 in the Royal Chapel. He visited Rome in 1679. In 1682 he is reported as living in the household of the Papal nuncio in Madrid, Savo Mellini. There are no references to him after the year 1687, which may be the year of his death.

Legacy

Manze expresses the opinion that the influence of Pandolfi's works can be detected in the sonatas of Arcangelo Corelli and others.

List of surviving works

6 Sonatas for Violin & Continuo, Opus 3 

No.1: La Stella
No.2: La Cesta
No.3: La Melana
No.4: La Castella
No.5: La Clemente
No.6: La Sabbatina

6 Sonatas for Violin & Continuo, Opus 4 

No.1: La Bernabea
No.2: La Viuviana
No.3: La Monella Romanesca
No.4: La Biancuccia
No.5: La Stella
No.6: La Vinciolina

Sonate Cio Balletti 

No.1: Capriccetto Il Tozz (2 violins & continuo)
No.2: Capriccetto Il Candeloro (2 violins & continuo)
No.3: Capriccetto Il Drago (2 violins & continuo)
No.4: Capriccetto Il Falvetti (2 violins & continuo)
No.5: Capriccetto Il Cara (2 violins & continuo)
No.6: Capriccetto Il Muscari (2 violins & continuo)
No.7: La Domenga Sarabanda (2 violins & continuo)
No.8: Balletto Il Folcognoni (2 violins & continuo)
No.9: Balletto Il Ferrotti (2 violins & continuo)
No.10: Balletto Il Giusto (2 violins & continuo)
No.11: Balletto Lo Giudice (2 violins & continuo)
No.12: Balletto Il Colangiolo (2 violins & continuo)
No.13: Trombetta (2 violins & continuo)
No.14: Passacaglio Il Marcquetta (2 violins & continuo)
No.15: Balletto Il Monforti (violin & continuo)
No.16: Capriccetto Il Raimondo (violin & continuo)
No.17: Capriccetto Il Mavritio (violin & continuo)
No.18: Capriccetto Il Catalano (violin & continuo)

References

Sources
 Longo, Fabrizio (2014). "Pandolfi, Domenico", in Dizionario Biografico degli Italiani, vol. 80. Rome: Treccani. Accessed 17 July 2020. (In Italian)

External links
Scores of sonatas op. 3 and 4 on the website Musikland Tyrol

Italian male classical composers
Italian Baroque composers
1624 births
17th-century Italian composers
Italian murderers
17th-century Italian Roman Catholic priests
1680s deaths
17th-century male musicians